Dracula Untold is a 2014 American action horror film directed by Gary Shore in his feature film debut and written by Matt Sazama and Burk Sharpless. A reboot of the Dracula film series, the plot creates an origin story for the titular character, rather than using the storyline of Bram Stoker's 1897 novel. In this adaptation, Dracula is the monster alter ego of historical figure Vlad III "the Impaler" Drăculea. Luke Evans portrays the title character, with Sarah Gadon, Dominic Cooper, Art Parkinson, and Charles Dance cast in supporting roles. Principal photography began in Northern Ireland on August 5, 2013.

Universal Pictures released the film in regular and IMAX cinemas on October 10, 2014. Dracula Untold grossed $217 million worldwide and received mixed reviews from critics.

Plot
In the 15th century, Vlad Drăculea is the Prince of Wallachia and Transylvania. As a child, he was a royal ward in the palace of the Sultan of the Ottoman Empire and was trained to be a soldier in the Sultan's elite Janissary corps, where he became their most feared warrior. He was called "Vlad the Impaler, Son of the Dragon", after slaughtering thousands by impaling them on spears, but became sickened by his own acts and abandoned his past.

Now ruling his domains in peace, Vlad and his soldiers discover a helmet in a stream and fear that an Ottoman scouting party is preparing the way for invasion. The stream leads to Broken Tooth Mountain, the top of which has a cave carpeted in crushed bone. Within the cave, they are attacked in the dark by an inhumanly strong and fast humanoid creature, killing Vlad's retinue. Vlad barely escapes and returns to his castle, where he learns from a local monk that the creature is a vampire, a Roman from the days of the Empire named Caligula, who was tricked by a demon for personal success and great powers, but was trapped in the cave as the price for this. Vlad celebrates an Easter feast with his wife Mirena and son Îngeraș, when an Ottoman contingent arrives at the castle. Vlad offers them the usual tribute payment of silver coins, but the emissary wants an additional tribute of 1,000 boys to be trained as Janissaries. Vlad refuses. Mirena believes Vlad can convince Sultan Mehmed II to show mercy. Vlad offers himself in place of the boys; but Mehmed refuses and demands Vlad's son in addition.

Knowing war is coming, Vlad returns to the Broken Tooth Mountain cave to seek help from the vampire. The vampire tells him there are consequences and offers him some of his blood, which will temporarily give Vlad the powers of a vampire. If he resists the intense urge to drink human blood for three days, he will turn back into a human. Otherwise, he will remain a vampire forever, and the ancient vampire will be freed, the seal on his cave broken by having given the darkness a worthy offering to plague the world like himself. Vlad accepts the offer. He discovers that he has the ability to transform into a cloud of bats. When he returns to Castle Dracula, the Ottoman army attacks, but Vlad single-handedly kills them all. He then sends most of the castle's subjects to Cozia Monastery for safety.

Mirena learns of Vlad's curse, as she sees him holding silver to keep himself weak when near his people to avoid revealing his condition to them or attacking them for blood. Vlad's sudden increased strength also arouses suspicion among his subjects.

That night, the Ottoman army marches on the monastery. Vlad commands an enormous swarm of bats to repel them; however, the soldiers are actually a decoy force, allowing a handful of Turks to infiltrate the monastery, kill many of the inhabitants and kidnap Îngeraș. Mirena tries to defend her son and falls from the edge of the monastery wall. Despite his superhuman speed, Vlad cannot reach her in time. Dying, Mirena pleads with Vlad to drink her blood before the sun rises and lifts his curse so that he will have the strength to save their son. Vlad reluctantly drinks her blood, triggering his final transformation into a full-blooded vampire and granting him even greater powers, and in doing so he frees the ancient vampire from his cave by breaking the magical seal imprisoning him. As he does so, he summons black storm clouds to block out the sun. Vlad returns to the monastery and turns the small group of survivors and mortally wounded into vampires as well.

At the Ottoman army's camp, Mehmed prepares for a massive invasion of Europe. Vlad and his vampires arrive, hidden by a large lightning storm, and easily massacre the terrified Ottoman soldiers, while Vlad himself goes after Mehmed, who is holding Îngeraș captive. Aware that vampires are weakened by silver, Mehmed has lined the floor of his tent with silver coins, reducing Vlad's strength and speed to that of a human — and impairing his vision — as Mehmed fights him with a silver sword. He overpowers Vlad and prepares to impale his heart with a wooden stake, but Vlad turns into a flock of bats and evades him. Taking the name "Dracula, Son of the Devil", he kills Mehmed with the stake and drinks his blood. Vlad then sends Îngeraș away before his vampire army preys on him, and dispels the storm clouds so that the vampires, including himself, will burn away and die in the light. However, a man who had previously observed Vlad's nature and wished to serve him drags his dying body out of the sunlight and offers him his blood, which restores Vlad to life. With Vlad presumed dead and Europe saved from the Ottoman invasion, Îngeraș is crowned the new Prince of Wallachia.

In the present day, Vlad meets a woman named Mina who strikingly resembles Mirena, in the streets of modern London. The vampire who cursed Vlad watches them from afar. As they walk away, he follows, saying "Let the games begin".

Cast
 Luke Evans as Vlad III "the Impaler" Drăculea / Dracula: Known as the Son of the Dragon, Vlad is a prince and war hero, who becomes a monster known as a vampire to protect and defend his family and kingdom.
 Dominic Cooper as Sultan Mehmed II
 Sarah Gadon as Mirena, Vlad's wife.
 Gadon also portrays Mina Murray as a part of the present-day ending.
 Art Parkinson as Îngeraș, son of Vlad and Mirena.
 Charles Dance as the Master Vampire, the one who turns Vlad into a vampire.
 William Houston as Cazan, Vlad's advisor.
 Diarmaid Murtagh as Dumitru, one of Vlad's men.
 Noah Huntley as Captain Petru, one of Vlad's men.
 Paul Kaye as Brother Lucian, a monk.
 Zach McGowan as Shkelgim, a mysterious Romani.
 Ferdinand Kingsley as Hamza Bey, one of Mehmed's generals.
 Joseph Long as Turahanoğlu Ömer Bey, one of Mehmed's generals.
 Thor Kristjansson as Bright Eyes, an assassin in the Ottoman Army.

Production

Development

In 2007, director Alex Proyas was hired by Universal Studios to direct the film Dracula: Year Zero. The film was to be produced by Michael De Luca and filmed in Australia. Later, Universal ended the deals with Proyas and scheduled star Sam Worthington because of the high budget. It was announced on February 10, 2012, by Deadline Hollywood that Irish director Gary Shore was in talks to direct. Matt Sazama and Burk Sharpless wrote the script for the new film. On April 25, 2013, The Hollywood Reporter confirmed that Universal had announced that the film would be released on August 8, 2014. On May 20, 2013, First Minister of Northern Ireland Peter Robinson and Deputy First Minister of Northern Ireland Martin McGuinness announced that Universal would film Dracula in August in Northern Ireland. On August 29, 2013, Variety reported that Legendary Pictures was considering co-financing the film. Legendary's involvement in production was confirmed in May 2014.

Casting
On January 25, 2010, it was announced that Sam Worthington was in negotiations to play Vlad the Impaler, and the film was set to release in 2011. On August 19, Worthington was confirmed to star in the film. On February 10, 2012, Deadline confirmed that Universal closed the deal with Worthington. On April 8, 2013, actor Luke Evans joined the cast, replacing Worthington to play the role of Vlad the Impaler, the man who would become the mythological bloodsucker Dracula. On May 2, 2013, Sarah Gadon joined the cast to star alongside Evans. On May 8, Variety announced that Dominic Cooper was in talks to join the cast. On July 11, 2013, Zach McGowan also signed on, to play the role of Shkelgim, a Romani chief. On July 26, Samantha Barks joined the cast to play a character from Eastern European folk tales known as Baba Yaga, a beautiful young woman who transforms into a savage witch. However, her scenes were later cut from the film. Along with Barks more cast was added, including Charlie Cox, Ferdinand Kingsley, William Houston, and Thor Kristjansson, the latter of whom would play the role of Bright Eyes, an Eastern European taken as a slave as a young boy and now an assassin in the Ottoman Army. Art Parkinson then joined on to play the role of Ingeras, son of Dracula.

Filming
On May 20, 2013, Universal confirmed that shooting would take place in Northern Ireland from August to November 2013. The film's shooting officially began on August 5, 2013, starting in Roe Valley Country Park in Northern Ireland. The production company received permission for two days of shooting, on August 5–6, to film in the park. Other location shooting took place throughout Northern Ireland.

In September 2014, actor Evans revealed that he received training every day after work, rehearsed with the stuntmen, and ate only chicken, beef, fish and green vegetables to get ready for the shoot of the film.

Music

Ramin Djawadi's score for the film was released by Backlot Music on October 7 on CD. Djawadi was originally chosen to work on the film's musical score after his work on Iron Man, Clash of the Titans, and Game of Thrones, and after signing on to score the film, he gave up his job of scoring the film Edge of Tomorrow, which was given to Christophe Beck. The official trailer features Lorde's cover of "Everybody Wants to Rule the World," which was produced by Michael A. Levine and Lucas Cantor.

Release
On April 25, 2013, Universal announced that the film would be released in theaters on August 8, 2014. It was announced four months later that the film would be postponed until October 3, 2014. The release date was pushed a third time to October 17, 2014. The release date was changed for a fourth and final time to October 10, 2014, to give the film three weeks of play before Halloween. The film was released in all formats including IMAX, and in over 25 foreign markets, on its opening weekend.

Home media
Dracula Untold was released on DVD and Blu-ray on February 3, 2015. The Blu-ray release comes with an alternate opening, deleted scenes, The Land of Dracula (Interactive Map), and Luke Evans: Creating a Legend.

Reception

Box office
Dracula Untold grossed $56.3 million in North America and $159.2 million in other territories for a worldwide total of $215.5 million against a budget of $70 million.

North America
Dracula Untold was released in North America on October 10, 2014, across 2,885 cinemas. It earned $1.3 million from Thursday late night showings from 2,133 theaters and $8.9 million in its opening day. The film debuted at #2 at the box office in its opening-weekend grossing $24.5 million behind Gone Girl. $4 million of the opening gross came from IMAX showings from 351 of its 2,887 locations which is the second-best October total behind only Gravity. Nine of the top 10 locations as well as 18 of the top 20 were in IMAX. The film played 57% male and 61% over-25-year-olds. In its second weekend the film fell 58% and earned $9.9 million.

Other territories
A few days ahead of its U.S. debut, Dracula Untold was released in 25 foreign markets and earned $21 million. It had a strong $5 million four-day opening in Mexico. The highest debuts came from Australia ($9 million), Germany ($4 million), Malaysia ($3 million), and France ($1 million). The following weekend the film was released to over 42 foreign territories and earned $33.9 million. The film went number one in nine of the 17 new-released territories. It earned $2.5 million from 155 IMAX screens for an overall total of $4.5 million and an international total of $8.5 million. It went #1 in Bolivia, Colombia, Czech Republic, Ecuador, Philippines, Slovakia, Thailand, Trinidad, and Vietnam. The film was released to four new markets in its third weekend and earned $14.7 million from 59 territories where Brazil generated $2.7 million and Spain collected $1.8 million. The film opened in Italy at #1 earning $3 million accounting 25% of the market shares. In Japan it earned $1.4 million.

Critical reception
On Rotten Tomatoes the film has an approval rating of 25% based on 138 reviews with an average rating of 5.62/10. The site's critical consensus reads, "Neither awful enough to suck nor sharp enough to bite, Dracula Untold misses the point of its iconic character's deathless appeal." On Metacritic, the film has a score of 40 out of 100 based on reviews from 30 critics, indicating "mixed or average reviews". Audiences polled by CinemaScore gave the film an average grade of "A−" on an A+ to F scale.

Frank Scheck of The Hollywood Reporter said, "Much like the recent, widely reviled I, Frankenstein, this misconceived project mainly signals a need to go back to the drawing board." The Village Voices Alan Scherstuhl criticized the film, "And so it was, and so it was dull, the greatest villain in all cinema bitten on the neck and drained of his hottest blood." Simon Adams for Roger Ebert's website gave Dracula Untold a score of 2.5/4 along with an average review, "If you can selectively ignore this litany of inanity, you may find some substantial earthy pleasures in Dracula Untold." Kyle Anderson of Entertainment Weekly gave the film a C grade and wrote, "It works neither as a sweeping historical epic nor as an action-horror hybrid." Stephen Whitty wrote a negative review for The Star-Ledger, "If this Dracula can kill hundreds of enemies by himself—and he can, and does, in several dull and protracted battle scenes—then where's the suspense? If he's become a monster for noble reasons, then where's the dark conflict?" The Seattle Times Moira MacDonald said, "It falls into that far-too-large category of studio offerings that aren't good enough to be noteworthy or terrible enough to be truly entertaining."

A. A. Dowd of The A.V. Club said, "Neither the Dracula we need nor the one we deserve." New York magazine's Bilge Ebiri wrote, "I don't want to oversell this film. But in an era in which we've seen a lot of failed attempts to reinvent classic fantasy tales as CGI-action spectacles, it feels remarkably assured." Film critic Mick LaSalle gave the film two stars out of four and wrote for San Francisco Chronicle, "Here we have a vampire movie that brings together elements from other more popular movies." Daniel Krupa from IGN said, "Dracula Untold recasts the famous vampire as a dark superhero. It's fast-paced, shallow fun." Tim Robey of The Telegraph positively said, "This origin story, starring Luke Evans, really isn't as bad as it might have been." He later added, "The intrigue can feel a little mechanical, but it doesn't overstay its welcome as badly as the clomping, similarly-designed Snow White and the Huntsman." Michael O'Sullivan of The Washington Post reviewed and responded in negative, "The film's problems aren't limited to liberal cadging from comic books. In fact, that's precisely what's best about the film, which occasionally boasts gorgeous visuals. But the movie doesn't know when to stop stealing." Jordan Hoffman of New York Daily News said, "The weapons, Turkish helmets and Szekler interiors are all gorgeous. If only the rest of this Lord of the Rings wanna-be were at the same level." Kevin C. Johnson commented for St. Louis Post-Dispatch "Dracula Untold feels longer than its 95-minute running time."

New York Posts Kyle Smith wrote, "This Vlad the Impaler has all the edge of Vlasic the pickle." Brian Truitt of USA Today said, "At times Dracula Untold flirts with dullness so much that it might as well just stick a stake in the heart of Bram Stoker's legacy." Toronto Stars Peter Howell asked, "Whatever possessed the makers of Dracula Untold to think we'd be interested in a tragically unhip romance that backstories the infamous bloodsucker?" The Boston Globes Peter Keough criticized the film, "It's not so much untold as rewritten—if not by J. R. R. Tolkien than by some clever 12-year-old overstimulated by The Lord of the Rings." Film critic Ben Kenigsberg reviewed the film for The New York Times, "The movie is the latest multiplex filler to co-opt a classic tale only to drown it in computer-generated murk. Even the title has the ring of something created by committee." James Berardinelli reviewed for website ReelViews, "A generic vampire tale in the Underworld vein that comes closer to the infamous Van Helsing than a memorable re-interpretation of a legendary monster." The Philadelphia Inquirers David Hiltbrand said, "The idea is to humanize one of the most fearful monsters in the Western crypt. But Dracula Untold goes way overboard, past domestication and into canonization." Wesley Morris wrote for the website Grantland, "Most of the time, I found myself feeling like I was waiting for a turn with the gaming controls."

Richard Corliss from Time magazine compared Dracula's origin story to Jesus Christ's story due to Dracula spending his childhood in a foreign land, and due to Dracula choosing to die (or become undead) in order to save his people. Corliss also complimented the film's use of its PG-13 rating by describing it as "robust". In his review, he stated, "Most reviewers have slammed the movie, but it's not nearly as awful, or offal, as its critical odor." He later stated, "[Evans] carries Untold by admirably fulfilling the two essential functions of a period-movie hero: to enunciate comic-book dialogue with Shakespearean authority and to look great with his shirt off." Graham Killeen of Milwaukee Journal Sentinel gave a positive review and wrote, "Dracula Untold tries to be The Lord of the Rings of horror movies. Surprisingly, it mostly succeeds." Kofi Outlaw of Screen Rant gave a fairly moderate review stating, "Dracula Untold is not a masterful or deep re-introduction to the franchise; but as basic genre fare, it's relatively fun in its depiction of the monster in a different light." Los Angeles Times critic Gary Goldstein wrote a positive review saying, "As effective and fat-free as its sinewy star, Luke Evans, Dracula Untold proves an absorbing, swiftly comprehensive origin tale."

The historian Adrianne Larsen, noted the film’s historical inaccuracies in relation to Vlad The Impaler and Mehmet II but advised people not to see the film because of its misogyny.

Legacy
On October 1, 2014, it was announced that reshoots had taken place shortly after the end of production to tie the film into the planned cinematic universe. A representative from Universal later denied that Dracula Untold was meant to start any sort of universe. Producer Alissa Phillips hoped that Evans's character might have a cameo in a future The Mummy film and also spoke of a potential sequel to Dracula to reboot the franchise. In an interview with IGN, director Gary Shore stated, "It's optional for them if they want to use it as that launching pad." On October 15,  After the release of Dracula Untold, the connections to the shared universe were downplayed, and The Mummy (2017) was re-positioned as the first film in the series.

By January 2019, Universal announced plans to return to standalone features instead of using a shared film narrative, effectively ending the Dark Universe.

See also
 List of vampire films
 Vlad the Impaler

References

External links

 
 
 
 

2014 films
2014 horror films
2010s action horror films
American alternate history films
American action horror films
American vampire films
Films scored by Ramin Djawadi
Films set in the Ottoman Empire
Films directed by Gary Shore
Films produced by Michael De Luca
Films set in Hungary
Films set in Transylvania
Films set in the 15th century
Films shot in Northern Ireland
Legendary Pictures films
IMAX films
Universal Pictures films
Cultural depictions of Vlad the Impaler
Cultural depictions of Mehmed the Conqueror
Films with screenplays by Matt Sazama and Burk Sharpless
2014 directorial debut films
2010s monster movies
Films set in castles
2010s English-language films
2010s American films